The Andohahela National Park is situated in Anosy in the south-east of Madagascar. It is remarkable for the extremes of habitats that are represented within it.

The Park was inscribed in the World Heritage Site in 2007 as part of the Rainforests of the Atsinanana.

History
Andohahela has been a protected area since 1939 but did not become a national park until 1998.

Geography
The park is divided into three zones.

Several circuits within each of the habitat types of the park can be accessed by road from the town of Tolagnaro. Detailed information on arranging trips is available from the tourism information office or from the Madagascar National Parks Association office in Tolagnaro.

Flora and fauna

The variety of habitats within Andohahela is mirrored in the richness of species that are found there, and the park is the richest place in Madagascar for lemurs. Fifteen species have been recorded, including two of Madagascar's most emblematic species, the ring-tailed lemur and Verreaux's sifaka. Some rare species of geckos, turtles and snakes are among the 67 species of reptiles found in the park, 130 species of birds and fifty species of amphibians. The Triangle palm is found only here.

See also
 National parks of Madagascar
 Tolagnaro (Fort Dauphin)
Sainte Luce Reserve

References

External links

 Official website (in French)

Anosy
1998 establishments in Madagascar
National parks of Madagascar
Protected areas established in 1998
World Heritage Sites in Madagascar
Madagascar subhumid forests
Madagascar lowland forests
Madagascar spiny thickets
Important Bird Areas of Madagascar